Heinz Ehlers (born January 25, 1966) is a Danish professional ice hockey coach and former ice hockey player. He was most recently the head coach of the SCL Tigers in the National League A (NLA) and the Denmark national hockey team.

Ehlers was selected by the New York Rangers in the 9th round (188th overall) of the 1984 NHL Entry Draft, but never played in the league. Ehlers played professionally in Europe for over 20 years, most notably in the Swedish Hockey League and Deutsche Eishockey Liga. He was inducted into the Danish ice hockey Hall of Fame in 2014.

Playing career 
After spending the early stages of his career in his native Aalborg, Ehlers embarked on a five-year stint with Leksands IF of the Swedish Hockey League (SHL) in 1984. In 1989, he transferred to another SHL team, AIK IF, and in 1991-92 helped Rögle BK earn promotion to the SHL.

Ehlers played in the Swiss elite league NLA for EHC Biel in 93-94, followed by two years with Klagenfurter AC of Austria. He left his mark in the German top-flight Deutsche Eishockey Liga, turning out for DEL teams Augsburger Panther and Berlin Capitals. He served as a team captain for the Capitals and returned to his native Denmark after five years in the German capital city.

Ehlers played another two years with AaB Ishockey and concluded his playing career following the 2003-04 campaign.

National team 
Ehlers earned a total of 104 caps for the Danish national team, tallying 60 goals and 103 assists. He played in nine World Championships. He was named head coach for the national team on June 29, 2018.

Coaching career 
His first head coaching stint came at Aalborg in 2005-06. In May 2007, he took over EHC Biel and steered the team to the NLB championship and promotion to the Swiss top-tier National League A (NLA). He was sacked in April 2009 following a run of six straight losses.

Ehlers accepted the head coaching job at NLB side SC Langenthal in November 2009. He hauled in his second NLB title in 2011-12 and the club's first ever. Ehlers left SCL after the 2012-13 campaign to take on a new challenge in Switzerland's top-flight National League A (NLA), signing with Lausanne HC in March 2013. He turned the newly promoted team into a solid NLA squad, guiding Lausanne to back-to-back playoff appearances in 2013-14 and 2014-15. Despite having a year of his contract left to run, he was relieved of his duties after the 2015-16 season. About a month before parting ways, Lausanne's president had questioned Ehlers' defensive style of play.

In early October 2016, he took over head coaching duties for the SCL Tigers of the Swiss NLA and additionally became assistant coach of Denmark's men's national team in October 2017.

Career statistics

Personal life
His son, Nikolaj was selected 9th overall in the 2014 NHL Entry Draft by the Winnipeg Jets. His first son, Sebastian, also plays professionally.

References

External links

1966 births
Aalborg Pirates players
AIK IF players
Augsburger Panther players
Berlin Capitals players
EHC Biel players
Living people
Danish ice hockey left wingers
EC KAC players
Leksands IF players
New York Rangers draft picks
Sportspeople from Aalborg
Rögle BK players
Danish ice hockey coaches
Denmark men's national ice hockey team coaches
Ice hockey coaches at the 2022 Winter Olympics
Danish expatriate ice hockey people
Danish expatriate sportspeople in Germany
Danish expatriate sportspeople in Sweden
Danish expatriate sportspeople in Switzerland
Danish expatriate sportspeople in Austria
Expatriate ice hockey players in Switzerland
Expatriate ice hockey players in Germany
Expatriate ice hockey players in Austria
Expatriate ice hockey players in Sweden